Henry Adoniram Swift (March 23, 1823February 25, 1869) was an American politician who was the third Governor of Minnesota. He served as governor from July 10, 1863 to January 11, 1864 after serving as the third Lieutenant Governor of Minnesota when Governor Alexander Ramsey resigned to enter the United States Congress. Prior to that he had served in the Minnesota Senate.  Swift was a Republican.

Described by peers as gentle, self-effacing, and ambivalent toward politics, Henry Swift was Minnesota's third governor for less than a year, completing the second term of Alexander Ramsey, who had been elected United States Senator. With little time or apparent inclination to effect major change, this un-elected governor concentrated on assuring the welfare of Civil War veterans.

After graduation with honors from Western Reserve College in his native Ohio, Swift tutored the children of a slave owner in Mississippi, an experience that reinforced his commitment to abolition. He returned to Ohio, earned a law degree, and began a career in business and government service.

He and his family journeyed to Minnesota in 1853, settling first in St. Paul then St. Peter. With his partners in the St. Peter Land Company, he campaigned, unsuccessfully, to relocate the state capital in their burgeoning Minnesota River town.

Swift left his commercial enterprises in 1861 for the state senate seat that propelled him into the governorship. Later he served two more terms in the senate and was a reluctant candidate for the U.S. Senate. "I shall be ten times happier with my family in St. Peter than as Senator at Washington," he declared characteristically upon learning he had lost the Republican senatorial nomination in 1865. Four years later, he succumbed to typhoid fever at age 45.

Swift County, Minnesota was named after him in 1870.

References

Biographical information and his  gubernatorial records are available for research use at the Minnesota Historical Society.
Minnesota Legislators Past and Present

1823 births
1869 deaths
People from Ravenna, Ohio
Republican Party governors of Minnesota
Lieutenant Governors of Minnesota
People of Minnesota in the American Civil War
Republican Party Minnesota state senators
Union (American Civil War) state governors
19th-century American politicians
People from St. Peter, Minnesota